Rimas Kurtinaitis (born 15 May 1960) is a Lithuanian professional basketball coach, and a retired professional basketball player, who was a member of the senior Soviet and Lithuanian national basketball teams during his playing career. He won a gold medal at 1988 Olympics in South Korea. He recently worked as the head coach for Khimki. At a height of 1.96 m (6'5") tall, during his playing career, he played at the shooting guard position. He is the only non-NBA player to ever participate at the NBA All-Star Weekend's Three-Point Contest, doing so in 1989, where he scored 9 points.

Club playing career
Kurtinaitis' former club teams as a player, include Žalgiris Kaunas, CSKA Moscow, and Real Madrid. He was the only European player to participate in the NBA All-Star Weekend's Three-Point Contest, without ever having played in the NBA by participating in the event in 1989. Kurtinaitis was also the first European player to play as an import, in Australia's National Basketball League (NBL), while playing for the Townsville Suns, in 1993.

Coaching career
In 1997, Kurtinaitis was named to the Lithuanian Ministry of Sport. In the years 2002–2006, he took the position of head coach of the Azerbaijan national basketball team. Also from 2002 to 2006, he was a player for four seasons, with Gala Baku, working as a player-coach.

He became Sakalai's head coach during the mid-2000s. In December 2007, he became the head coach of the Polish League men's basketball team, Śląsk Wrocław. In 2008, he became head coach of Lietuvos Rytas, with whom, he won the EuroCup 2008–09 season's title. After winning the championship at the Final-Eight tournament, in Turin (Torino), Italy, in a game against Khimki Moscow Region (final score 80–74).

In 2012, Kurtinaitis won the EuroCup again, this time with Khimki. As of 2015, he is the only coach to win the EuroCup three times. On 21 June 2012 Kurtinaitis was named the best EuroCup coach of all time. On 15 March 2016 Khimki parted ways with Kurtinaitis.

On 2 August 2016 Kurtinaitis become the head coach of Pallacanestro Cantù, of the Italian LBA. However, on 30 November 2016 he was fired from the team.

Kurtinaitis agreed to return to Lietuvos rytas on 10 February 2017, following the resignation of Tomas Pačėsas, from the club's head coaching position. This tenure with Rytas was not as successful – Rytas only finished in 3rd place in the LKL in the 2016–2017 season, a fiasco for the team. In the 2017–2018 season, the team played much better, reaching the Eurocup Top16 phase, as well as reaching the KMT and LKL finals, but lost each to Žalgiris Kaunas. In what stirred a lot of controversy, it was announced during the semifinals of the LKL that Kurtinaitis would be replaced by Dainius Adomaitis in the following season, and in June Kurtinaitis left the team.

On 21 January 2019 Kurtinaitis returned to Khimki in a surprising decision. Two years later, on 15 January 2021, he was dismissed from this position because of unsatisfactory results.

Awards and achievements
As player:

Pro clubs
 5× USSR Premier League Champion: 1982, 1983, 1985, 1986 1987
 USSR Cup Winner: (1982)
 FIBA Saporta Cup Finals Top Scorer: (1985)
 FIBA Intercontinental Cup Champion: 1986
 NBA All-Star Weekend Three-Point Contest Participant: 1989 
 German League Top Scorer: (1990)
 German All-Star Game Three-point Champion: 1991
 Spanish ACB League Champion: 1994
 2× Lithuanian All-Star Game: 1996, 1998
 Lithuanian All-Star Game MVP: 1996
 Lithuanian League Champion: 1996
 Lithuanian League Finals MVP: 1996

Soviet senior national team
 1985 EuroBasket: 
 1986 FIBA World Championship:  
 1988 Summer Olympic Games: 
 1989 EuroBasket:

Lithuanian senior national team
 1992 Summer Olympic Games: 
 1995 EuroBasket: 
 1996 Summer Olympic Games:

As head coach
 3× EuroCup Champion: 2009, 2012, 2015
 2× Lithuanian LKL League Champion: 2009, 2010
 Baltic BBL League Champion: 2009
 2× Lithuanian Federation Cup Winner: 2009, 2010
 VTB United League Champion: 2011
 Named Best EuroCup Coach of All Time: 2012
 VTB United League Coach of the Year: 2014
 VTB United League Hall of Fame: 2019

Notes

References

External links
 Rimas Kurtinaitis at acb.com 
 Rimas Kurtinaitis at euroleague.net
 
 Rimas Kurtinaitis at fibaeurope.com
 Rimas Kurtinaitis at leagabasket.it 

1960 births
Living people
1986 FIBA World Championship players
Basketball players at the 1988 Summer Olympics
Basketball players at the 1992 Summer Olympics
Basketball players at the 1996 Summer Olympics
Basketball players from Kaunas
BC Khimki coaches
BC Rytas coaches
BC Rytas players
BC Žalgiris players
CB Peñas Huesca players
Élan Chalon players
Expatriate basketball people in Australia
Expatriate basketball people in Azerbaijan
FIBA EuroBasket-winning players
Honoured Masters of Sport of the USSR
Liga ACB players
Lithuanian basketball coaches
Lithuanian expatriate basketball people in France
Lithuanian expatriate basketball people in Germany
Lithuanian expatriate basketball people in Italy
Lithuanian expatriate basketball people in Latvia
Lithuanian expatriate basketball people in Russia
Lithuanian expatriate basketball people in Spain
Lithuanian expatriate basketball people in Ukraine
Lithuanian expatriate sportspeople in Australia
Lithuanian expatriate sportspeople in Azerbaijan
Lithuanian expatriate sportspeople in Poland
Lithuanian men's basketball players
Lithuanian Sports University alumni
LSU-Atletas basketball players
Medalists at the 1988 Summer Olympics
Medalists at the 1992 Summer Olympics
Medalists at the 1996 Summer Olympics
Olympic basketball players of Lithuania
Olympic basketball players of the Soviet Union
Olympic bronze medalists for Lithuania
Olympic gold medalists for the Soviet Union
Olympic medalists in basketball
Pallacanestro Cantù coaches
PBC CSKA Moscow players
Real Madrid Baloncesto players
Shooting guards
Soviet men's basketball players
Townsville Crocodiles players